Peter Michael Murphy (born 27 October 1980, in Dublin) is an Irish football player and coach, who is currently manager of Scottish League Two club Annan Athletic. Murphy played as a defender, but also operated through midfield. He currently holds the club record at Carlisle United for the most appearances for the club as an outfield player with over 400, before being released after 12 years of service in 2013.

Playing career

Club
Murphy played his youth football at St Josephs Boys AFC football club in Dublin. He then went on to play for Blackburn Rovers, Halifax Town (on loan, scoring his first career goal in a match against Kidderminster Harriers) and Carlisle United.

While at Brunton Park Murphy started 400+ games and scored the winning goal in the Conference National Playoff Final 2005, which ensured The Cumbrians return to the Football League. On their return, Murphy also played a major part in the team that won the League Two title in 2006 and that narrowly missed out on the League One play-offs in 2007. Murphy was out of contract at the end of the 2006–07 season initially rejecting an offer of a new contract. In July 2007, Murphy accepted a new contract from Carlisle United, signing a two-year contract. On 3 April 2011, Murphy scored the winning goal in the final of the Football League Trophy at Wembley Stadium against Brentford. Two days before the match, Murphy's partner Lisa gave birth to a baby son.

Murphy has become a Carlisle favourite because of his upbeat personality, and his record for most games of any outfield player in club history. On 7 October there was a testimonial match to mark his 10+ years of service with the Cumbrian club, in which a host of ex-Carlisle superstars took to the field on Brunton Park, with Grant Holt, Danny Graham, Keiren Westwood and Ian Harte all making the trip to Cumbria for this special occasion to celebrate his loyalty and service to Carlisle United.

At the end of the 2012–13 season, Murphy was released by Carlisle. Five Months after his release from Carlisle United, Murphy joined Carlisle based non-league side Celtic Nation.

On 24 July 2014, Murphy signed for Scottish League One club Ayr United. He scored his first goal for the club in a 3–2 defeat to Airdrieonians. Murphy spent three seasons with the Honest Men, before being released on 10 May 2017 after the club's relegation from the Scottish Championship.

International
Murphy is a former Ireland under-19 and under-21 international, playing in the UEFA Under-19 Championships in 1999. In May 2007, Murphy received his first call up to the senior Republic of Ireland squad for the two-game American tour against Ecuador and Bolivia. Murphy's international début came against Bolivia when he started the match before being substituted at half time. This appearance meant he became first Carlisle United player to win full international honours while with the Brunton Park club since Eric Welsh, who won four caps for Northern Ireland in the 1960s.

Managerial career
Murphy's first managerial appointment came with Scottish League Two side Annan Athletic, where he was appointed player/manager on 2 June 2017.

Peter Murphy won the Ladbrokes Manager of the Month in August 2018 and won it again alongside Chris Johnston who won Player of the Month in February 2019.

Career statistics

Managerial record

Honours
Carlisle United
Football League Two (1): 2005–06
Football League Trophy (1): 2011

References

External links

Official Carlisle United profile
 https://web.archive.org/web/20120405211030/http://www.petermurphytestimonialyear.co.uk/
Ireland stats at 11v11

1980 births
Living people
Association footballers from Dublin (city)
Republic of Ireland association footballers
Association football defenders
Blackburn Rovers F.C. players
Halifax Town A.F.C. players
Carlisle United F.C. players
Celtic Nation F.C. players
Ayr United F.C. players
Annan Athletic F.C. players
Annan Athletic F.C. managers
English Football League players
National League (English football) players
Scottish Professional Football League players
Republic of Ireland under-21 international footballers
Republic of Ireland international footballers
Scottish Professional Football League managers
Republic of Ireland football managers